

ala-alb
Ala-Cort
Ala-Quin
Ala-Scalp
Ala-Tet
alacepril (INN)
alacizumab pegol (INN)
alafosfalin (INN)
alagebrium chloride (USAN)
Alamast
alanine (INN)
alanosine (INN)
alaproclate (INN)
alatrofloxacin (INN)
Alavert
alazanine triclofenate (INN)
albaconazole (USAN)
Albalon
Albamycin
albendazole oxide (INN)
albendazole (INN)
Albenza
Albert Tiafen
albifylline (INN)
albiglutide (USAN)
albinterferon alfa-2B (USAN, INN)
albitiazolium bromide (INN)
albuglutide (INN)
Albuminar
Albunex
Albutein
albuterol (INN)
albutoin (INN)

alc-ale
alcaftadine (USAN, INN)
Alcaine
Alcalak
alclofenac (INN)
alclometasone (INN)
alcloxa (INN)
alcohol, the type known as ethanol
Alcomicin
Alconefrinasal Solution
alcuronium chloride (INN)
Aldactazide
Aldactone
Aldara (3m), also known as imiquimod
aldesleukin (INN)
aldesulfone sodium (INN)
aldioxa (INN)
Aldoclor
Aldomet (Merck), also known as methyldopa
Aldoril
aldosterone (INN)
Aldurazyme
alefacept (USAN)
aleglitazar (USAN, INN)
alemtuzumab (INN)
alendronic acid (INN)
alentemol (INN)
aleplasinin (USAN, INN)
alepride (INN)
Aler-Dryl
Alertec
Alesse
alestramustine (INN)
Aleve (Bayer), also known as naproxen
alexidine (INN)
alexitol sodium (INN)

alf-alg
alfacalcidol (INN)
alfadex (INN)
alfadolone (INN)
alfaprostol (INN)
alfaxalone (INN)
Alfenta (Taylor) redirects to alfentanil
alfentanil (INN)
alferminogene tadenovec (USAN, INN)
Alferon
alfetamine (INN)
alfimeprase (USAN)
alfuzosin (INN)
algeldrate (INN)
algenpantucel-L (USAN)
algestone (INN)
alglucerase (INN)
alglucosidase alfa (USAN)

ali-alk
alibendol (INN)
alicaforsen (INN, USAN)
aliconazole (INN)
alifedrine (INN)
aliflurane (INN)
alimadol (INN)
alimemazine (INN)
Alimta (Eli Lilly and Company)
alinastine (INN)
Alinia (Romark Laboratories)
alinidine (INN)
alipamide (INN)
alipogene tiparvovec (INN)
alisertib (INN, USAN)
aliskiren (USAN)
alisporivir INN, USAN)
alitretinoin (INN)
alizapride (INN)
Alka-Mints (Bayer)
Alka-Seltzer (Bayer)
Alkeran (GlaxoSmithKline) 
Alkergot (Sandoz)

all
Allay (BioElectronics)
Allegra-D (Sanofi-Aventis) mixture of fexofenadine and pseudoephedrine
Allegra (Sanofi-Aventis), also known as fexofenadine
Aller-Chlor
Allercon Tablet
Allerdryl (Valeant Pharmaceuticals)
Allerfed
AllerMax
Allernix
Allerphed
Allersol
Alli (GlaxoSmithKline)
alletorphine (INN)
allobarbital (INN)
alloclamide (INN)
allocupreide sodium (INN)
allomethadione (INN)
allopurinol (INN)
allylestrenol (INN)
allylprodine (INN)
allylthiourea (INN)

alm-aln
almadrate sulfate (INN)
almagate (INN)
almagodrate amcinonide (INN)
almasilate (INN)
almecillin (INN)
almestrone (INN)
alminoprofen (INN)
almitrine (INN)
almokalant (INN)
Almora
almorexant INN
almotriptan (INN)
almoxatone (INN)
almurtide (INN)
alnespirone (INN)
alniditan (INN)

alo
Alocril
alogliptin (USAN, INN)
Alomide
alonacic (INN)
alonimid (INN)
Alophen
Aloprim
Alora
aloracetam (INN)
alosetron (INN)
alovudine (INN)
Aloxi
aloxiprin (INN)
aloxistatin (INN)
alozafone (INN)

alp-als
alpertine (INN)
Alpha Chymar
Alphacaine
alphacetylmethadol (INN)
Alphaderm
Alphadrol
alphafilcon A (USAN)
Alphagan
Alphalin
alphameprodine (INN)
alphamethadol (INN)
Alphamul
Alphanate
AlphaNine SD
alphaprodine (INN)
Alphaquin HP
Alpharedisol
Alphatrex
Alphazine
alpidem (INN)
alpiropride (INN)
alprafenone (INN)
alprazolam (INN)
alprenolol (INN)
alprostadil (INN)
alrestatin (INN)
Alrex
alsactide (INN)

alt-alv
Altace (Pfizer/Sanofi-Aventis)
Altamist
altanserin (INN)
altapizone (INN)
Altebrel (INN)
alteconazole (INN)
alteplase (INN)
Altinac
altinicline (INN)
altizide (INN)
Altocor
altoqualine (INN)
altrenogest (INN)
altretamine (INN)
altumomab (INN)
Alu-Cap
Alu-Tab
Aludrox
aluminium clofibrate (INN)
Alupent (Boehringer Ingelheim)
Alustra
alusulf (INN)
alvameline maleate (USAN)
alvelestat (INN)
alverine (INN)
alvespimycin (USAN, INN)
alvimopan (USAN)
alvircept sudotox (INN)
alvocidib (INN)